Croughton may refer to:

 The village of Croughton, Northamptonshire, England
 The hamlet of Croughton, Cheshire, England
 The airbase of RAF Croughton in Northamptonshire, England